Seligeria is a genus of moss. There are 38 unique species of Seligeria on The Plant List.

Distribution 
Seligeria can be found in Europe, North America, New Zealand and Tasmania. Most species of Seligeria are native to the Northern Hemisphere, but Seligeria cardotti and Seligeria diminuta are native to the Southern Hemisphere.

References

External links 
 Identification guide
 Seligeria calcarea in Northern Ireland

Moss genera
Grimmiales